Asger Sørensen (born 5 June 1996) is a Danish professional footballer who currently plays for Czech First League club Sparta Prague. His former clubs include FC Liefering, Red Bull Salzburg, SSV Jahn Regensburg and 1. FC Nürnberg.

Club career
A defender, Sørensen began his career at the lower levels at Virklund Boldklub before moving to Silkeborg IF, before finally signing with the FC Midtjylland youth academy. On 23 September 2013, he made his senior debut for Midtjylland in a Danish Cup match against FC Djursland. This would be his only appearance for the club. In January 2014, he was signed by FC Red Bull Salzburg and was subsequently placed in their feeder club FC Liefering. Sørensen made his debut for the side on 7 March 2014 in a home game against SC Austria Lustenau.

An ankle injury kept Sørensen sidelined for most of the 2014–15 season, only making his return in the 30th round of competition for FC Liefering. However, a hand fracture meant that he would be sidelined for another extended period of time, making only nine appearances during the 2015–16 season. He played more regularly the following season, making 15 appearances in which he scored one goal. Sørensen made 41 total appearances for Liefering, scoring one goal, while making three total appearances for FC Red Bull Salzburg.

In July 2017, Red Bull Salzburg loaned Sørensen to 2. Bundesliga club Jahn Regensburg on a two-year loan deal. He made 52 total appearances for Jahn Regensburg during his tenure there.

Sørensen did not return to Salzburg ahead of the 2019–20 season, instead signing a two-year contract with recently relegated 1. FC Nürnberg in the 2. Bundesliga. On 27 July 2019, he made his debut for the club in league match against Dynamo Dresden away at Rudolf-Harbig-Stadion, which ended in a 1–0 win for Nürnberg. On 20 July 2022, Sørensen signed for Sparta Prague.

International career
Sørensen made five appearances for the Denmark under-16 team and 10 appearances for the under-17 team. Later, he would also go on to gain three and one caps, respectively, for the Denmark under-18 team and under-20 team.

On 31 August 2017, Sørensen made his debut for the Denmark national under-21 team in a 3–0 win over the Faroe Islands in Tórshavn in a 2019 UEFA European Under-21 Championship qualification match.

Honours
 Austrian Bundesliga: 2014–15

References

External links

1996 births
Living people
People from Silkeborg
Association football defenders
Danish men's footballers
Austrian Football Bundesliga players
2. Liga (Austria) players
2. Bundesliga players
FC Red Bull Salzburg players
FC Liefering players
SSV Jahn Regensburg players
1. FC Nürnberg players
Expatriate footballers in Austria
Danish expatriate sportspeople in Austria
Danish expatriate men's footballers
Sportspeople from the Central Denmark Region
AC Sparta Prague players
Expatriate footballers in the Czech Republic
Danish expatriate sportspeople in the Czech Republic